"Don Quichotte (No Están Aquí)", also known simply as "Don Quichotte", is a single by French band Magazine 60 released on 1984 through CBS Records, which is included in their second studio album Costa del Sol . It was written and produced by Jean-Luc Drion and Dominique Régiacorte.  "Don Quichotte" peaked at number 10 in France, 25 in Austria, 42 in Netherlands and 56 in the United States.

Background
The song features lyrics in Spanish and a dialogue in English.  The song is inspired on fictional characters Don Quixote and Sancho Panza from Miguel de Cervantes ' Don Quixote.

Music video 
The music video was directed by Jacques Samyn, and it features Olivier dressed as a maid and the other two members performing the song. An alternative music video was made, in which Magazine 60 are seen performing the song in public streets.

Track listing

Personnel 
Credits adapted from "Don Quichotte" and Costa del Sol liner notes.

Magazine 60

 Dominique Régiacorte
 Veronique Olivier
 Pierre Mastro

Musicians

Gérard Dulinski – percussion
Design

 Eddy Delbroeck – photograph (standard version)
 The Snap Organisation – design (UK's "U.S. Remix" single cover)

Production

 Jean-Luc Drion – production
 Dominique Régiacorte – production, recording, mixing
 Martín Rodríguez – remixing (U.S. Remix)
Recorded, produced and mixed at Studio D.J.L.

Charts

Weekly charts

References

External links
 Lyrics of this song at Genius

1984 singles
1984 songs
Music based on Don Quixote